Tara Elizabeth Laszlo (born 30 October 1971) is a former American female speed skater who was also a primary sprint skater. She represented United States at the 1992 Winter Olympics and competed in the women's 1500 metres and in the women's 5000 metres events.
Current town Prescott, Wis.
Married to Dominick Navarro.

References 

1971 births
Living people
American female speed skaters
Speed skaters at the 1992 Winter Olympics
Olympic speed skaters of the United States
Speed skaters from Saint Paul, Minnesota
21st-century American women